Pedras Grandes is a municipality in Brazilian State of Santa Catarina.

History

Pedras Grandes is a town of Italian immigration. In 1877, the first Italian immigrants arrived from Veneto. The town thrived on coal mining . The town was elevated to a municipality in 1961. Until then, it was a district of Tubarão. It is considered the "cradle" of Italian settlement in Southern Santa Catarina.

Geography
Situated at 28º26'09" South and 49º11'06" West, upon River Tubarão. Its population, as of 2020, was estimated at 3,953 inhabitants, of whom 90% is estimated to be of Italian descent. The area of the municipality is 153,81 km².

References

External links
Prefeitura de Pedras Grandes

Municipalities in Santa Catarina (state)